The Globe of Science and Innovation is a visitor center, designed to inform visitors about the significant research being carried out at CERN. In 2004, it was moved to its current location in Meyrin in the Canton of Geneva, Switzerland.

History of the Globe 
The globe started life as the Palais de l'Equilibre at Expo.02 in Neuchâtel, Switzerland. It was designed by Geneva architects, Hervé Dessimoz and Thomas Büchi, as a model of sustainable building. The globe consists of two concentric spheres nested within one another, made up of five different types of timber: Scotch pine, Douglas pine, spruce, larch, and Canadian maple. The outer shell is composed of wooden slats, and two ramps run between the two spheres, allowing visitors to see out. The inner sphere is made of 18 wooden arches, covered by wooden panels; this forms the walls of the globe's interior. This construction model enables the globe to act as a natural carbon sink.

After Expo.02 was closed, the Swiss Confederation donated the Palais de l'Equilibre to CERN, and it was renamed the Globe of Science and Innovation. It was moved and re-opened in 2004, in time for the 50th anniversary of CERN. In 2010, the globe was renovated and its new, permanent exhibit, Universe of Particles, was opened.

The globe is managed by the Foundation for the Globe of Science and Innovation.

Exhibitions

Universe of Particles 
The first floor of the renovated globe is dedicated to the globe's only permanent exhibition, Universe of Particles, which was designed by the architectural firm, Atelier Brückner. It is divided into six exhibition areas:

 Mysterious worlds - this section presents some of the questions about the universe that are studied at CERN.
 Large Hadron Collider (LHC) - this section includes a large map of CERN and the path that particles take in the accelerator.
 Detecting particles - the heart of the exhibition, this section demonstrates how the particles are accelerated and detected.
 Science without borders - this section demonstrates how basic research leads to modern technology. The first World Wide Web server, a NeXT workstation, is shown in this area.
 In their own words - scientists' own words about the questions that drive their research.
 Research area - a live display of LHC collisions

Second floor 
The second floor, which is reached by a third walking ramp, is a high-ceilinged multipurpose space that is used for events such as lectures, films, and press conferences. The walls along the ramp describe the Big Bang.

References

External links 

 The Globe of Science and Innovation, museum website
 Globe of Science and Innovation Brochure
 EXPO.02 Palais de l'Equilibre brochure

CERN
Buildings and structures in the canton of Geneva
Tourist attractions in the canton of Geneva